CSKA Kyiv is a team handball club from Kyiv, Ukraine. The club once was very strong in the Soviet championships and early championships of Ukraine.

Accomplishments
Soviet men′s handball championship: 3
Champion: 1966, 1968, 1981
Runner-up: 1971, 1982, 1983, 1984, 1989
Ukrainian men′s handball championship: 2
Champion: 1992, 1994
Runner-up: 1995
Bronze: 1993

External links

Ukrainian handball clubs
Sport in Kyiv
Armed Forces sports society (Ukraine)
Sports clubs established in 1946
1946 establishments in Ukraine